Sunny Side is a city in Spalding County, Georgia, United States. The population was 142 at the 2000 census.

History
A post office called Sunny Side was established in 1871. The name "Sunny Side" was commendatorily applied to this place. The Georgia General Assembly incorporated Sunny Side as a town in 1897.

Geography

Sunny Side is located at  (33.341724, -84.290254).

According to the United States Census Bureau, the city has a total area of 0.2 square mile (0.5 km), all land.

Demographics

As of the census of 2000, there were 142 people, 53 households, and 36 families residing in the city. The racial makeup of the city was 97.18% White, and 2.82% from two or more races.

There were 53 households, out of which 30.2% had children under the age of 18 living with them, 52.8% were married couples living together, 11.3% had a female householder with no husband present, and 30.2% were non-families. 24.5% of all households were made up of individuals, and 11.3% had someone living alone who was 65 years of age or older. The average household size was 2.68 and the average family size was 3.14.

In the city, the population was spread out, with 25.4% under the age of 18, 12.0% from 18 to 24, 28.2% from 25 to 44, 21.8% from 45 to 64, and 12.7% who were 65 years of age or older. The median age was 34 years. For every 100 females, there were 121.9 males. For every 100 females age 18 and over, there were 100.0 males.

The median income for a household in the city was $27,083, and the median income for a family was $30,625. Males had a median income of $26,000 versus $17,500 for females. The per capita income for the city was $11,769. There were 14.7% of families and 13.2% of the population living below the poverty line, including 16.1% of under eighteens and 22.2% of those over 64.

References

Cities in Georgia (U.S. state)
Cities in Spalding County, Georgia